Caldas is a town and municipality in Antioquia Department, Colombia. Caldas is part of The Metropolitan Area of the Aburrá Valley.  It is the seat of the Roman Catholic Diocese of Caldas.

Climate
Caldas has a subtropical highland climate (Cfb) with abundant rainfall year-round.

Notables Caldeños 
Luis Fernando Montoya professional soccer coach
Ciro Mendía poet and playwright

References

Municipalities of Antioquia Department
The Metropolitan Area of the Aburrá Valley